Kalju Tonuma is an Australian music producer, songwriter, drummer and performer of Estonian descent.  He is one half of the production team MEJU (pronounced "me-you") which he founded with Megan Bernard in 2014. He also manages record label Of One Kind and live-stream venue The B Side. Tonuma also performs as the drummer for Anactoria, Megan Bernard and The Indulgence.

He began his career in 1989 at Platinum Studios in South Yarra, Australia.  He has been nominated for a number of Australian Recording Industry Association (ARIA) Music Awards.  These include 'Engineer of the Year' (1994) for This Is The Sharp by The Sharp, ‘Engineer of the Year’ (1999) for Kid Indestructible by 28 Days; Felicity Hunter's "Hardcore Adore"; and The Mavis's "Puberty Song", as well as ‘Engineer of the Year’ and ‘Producer of the Year’ (2001) for Superheist’s The Prize Recruit.  In 2007, he completed a Master of Music Degree (M.Mus.) at Queensland University of Technology (QUT).

Gold and Platinum Records
1995 - The Sharp - GOLD (album) - This Is The Sharp
1997 - The Mavis's - GOLD (single & album) - Cry/Pink Pills
2000 - 28 Days - DOUBLE PLATINUM (album) - Upstyledown GOLD (single) - Rip It Up
2005 - Bodyjar - GOLD (album) - How It Works
2009 - The Temper Trap - PLATINUM (album) SILVER (UK album) - Conditions
2009 - The Living End - DOUBLE PLATINUM (album) - White Noise
2010 - Superheist - GOLD (album) - The Prize Recruit

Awards and nominations
1994 - Nominated for Engineer Of The Year (ARIA Music Awards)
1999 - Nominated for Engineer Of The Year (ARIA Music Awards)
2001 - Nominated for Engineer Of The Year (ARIA Music Awards)
2001 - Nominated for Producer Of The Year (ARIA Music Awards)

Mixing Credits
2 - Taipan Tiger Girls

MEJU single releases
Well Done (April 2020)
Change (May 2020) 
Turnaround (June 2020) 
All Is Good (November 2020) 
Used To Have A Job  feat. Pesky Bones (Peter Farnan) (November 2020)

MEJU productions
Anactoria - Good Mind 
Khristian Mizzi - Hold Onto Me 
Datson + Hughes - Flowers and the Axe 
Kate Jukes & The Blue Healers - Heart One

References

External links
 
 

Australian audio engineers
Australian record producers
Living people
Musicians from Melbourne
Year of birth missing (living people)